, known by her stage names Suzuka and Su-metal (both stylized in all caps), is a Japanese musician, singer, songwriter and model. She is best known as a member of the kawaii metal band Babymetal. She is represented by the talent agency Amuse, Inc. and has been a member of three musical groups formed by the company: Karen Girl's, Sakura Gakuin, and Babymetal.

Biography 
In 2002, Nakamoto won the Grand Prix in the Image Girl contest for Jewel Drop, a line of toy cosmetics produced by Bandai, subsequently starring in several Jewel Drop commercials.

In 2006, Nakamoto was admitted to Actor's School Hiroshima (ASH). She studied with another future Sakura Gakuin member, with whom she had been acquainted before attending the school. She also had a rivalry with Riho Sayashi, future Morning Musume member and Babymetal support dancer, as they were considered the school's top two students at the time.

In 2007, she was signed to the talent agency Amuse, Inc. after becoming a runner-up in the 2nd Star Kids Audition held by the company.

In 2008, her agency formed a trio called Karen Girl's, and Suzuka was selected to be in it. The group was introduced as a little sister of the girl trio Perfume and sang several theme songs for the anime Zettai Karen Children, disbanding on March 31, 2009, after the anime ended its run.

In April 2010, Nakamoto became a founding member of Sakura Gakuin, an idol group created by her agency. The group members also formed sub-units called “clubs”, each of which released their own songs as a unit.

In the spring of 2013, Nakamoto graduated from junior high school and therefore had to "graduate" from Sakura Gakuin (which limits girls up to the junior high age). Her graduation concert was held on March 31 at the Tokyo International Forum. Suzuka now performs with Babymetal, which had been spun off from Sakura Gakuin following her graduation, under the stage name Su-metal. Babymetal's self-titled debut album was released in February 2014.

Nakamoto ranked ninth place on the Oricon News ranking for “2018 Rankings for Anticipation of New Adults”, commenting on her "overwhelming singing ability".

In October 2022, with the release of the single Divine Attack - Shingeki -, Nakamoto was credited for the first time as a lyricist on a song by Babymetal.

Personal life
Suzuka is the youngest of three sisters. Her second sister, Himeka Nakamoto, is a former member of the idol group Nogizaka46. They studied together at the Actor's School Hiroshima (ASH) and sang together in a duo known as Tween.

Her mother works with gemstones and occasionally gives gemstone accessories to the Babymetal members as a gift. Her father played in a rock band called Hooligans.

Associated acts 
 Karen Girl's (2008 — March 31, 2009)

 Sakura Gakuin (April 2010 — March 31, 2013)
 Babymetal (2010 — present)

Timeline

Discography

With Karen Girl's 
Fly to the Future (2009)

With Sakura Gakuin 
Sakura Gakuin 2010 Nendo: Message (2011)
Sakura Gakuin 2011 Nendo: Friends (2012)
Sakura Gakuin 2012 Nendo: My Generation (2013)

With Babymetal 
Babymetal (2014)
Metal Resistance (2016)
 Metal Galaxy (2019)
 The Other One (2023)

Filmography

Anime
2009: Zettai Karen Children (episode 40) - Herself (with Karen Girl's) (cameo)

Commercial
 2012: "Oshii! Hiroshima"

References

External links
 Official profile at Amuse Inc.

 

Babymetal members
Sakura Gakuin members
1997 births
Living people
Japanese female idols
Japanese women heavy metal singers
21st-century Japanese women singers
Musicians from Hiroshima
Kawaii metal musicians
Amuse Inc. talents